Radical 124 or radical  meaning "feather" is one of the 29 Kangxi radicals (214 radicals in total) composed of 6 strokes.

In the Kangxi Dictionary, there are 220 characters (out of 49,030) to be found under this radical.

 is also the 147th indexing component in the Table of Indexing Chinese Character Components predominantly adopted by Simplified Chinese dictionaries published in mainland China.

Evolution

Derived characters

Variant forms

In modern Japanese, the Kangxi form (old form) and the written form (new form) are encoded separately in JIS and Unihan (New : U+7FBD; Old : U+FA1E).

Literature

External links

Unihan Database - U+7FBD

124
147